Malthonea ruficornis is a species of beetle in the family Cerambycidae. It was described by Belon in 1903. It is known from Bolivia and Ecuador.

References

Desmiphorini
Beetles described in 1903